Melody Aflam was a Canadian pay television channel that was owned by Ethnic Channels Group. It broadcast programming from Melody Aflam as well as local Canadian content.

Background
Melody Aflam was a top rated film channel from Egypt. It featured a wide variety of top tier films from the Arab world including classics and current hits, spanning all decades from the 1950s through to the present day. The movies aired covered all genres from action to comedy to historical films.

The Melody TV network was owned by Gamal Marwan, son of Ashraf Marwan. The network ceased to exist by 2013 due to financial difficulties.

References

Bibliography

External links
 Ethnic Channels Group page
 Melody's official website 
 YouTube channel

Egyptian-Canadian culture
Digital cable television networks in Canada
Television channels and stations established in 2006
Television channels and stations disestablished in 2013
Arabic-language television in Canada
Arabic-language television stations